Istiqlal Mosque is one of the largest mosques in Sarajevo, Bosnia and Herzegovina. It was named after Istiqlal Mosque, Jakarta, the national mosque of Indonesia, since the mosque was a gift from the Indonesian people and government for Bosnia and Herzegovina as a token of solidarity and friendship between the two nations. The name "istiqlal" is Arabic word for "independence", thus it is also meant to commemorate the independence of Bosnia and Herzegovina.

Activities
Other than its regular function as a house of prayers; the regular daily 5 times salat and other prayers (Jumu'ah and Eids), Istiqlal mosque also hosts maktab and Quran recital competitions for children and adults. The mosque also served as Project Bureau Center for Islamic Architecture, arranging Sharia weddings, and also as Indonesian Cultural Center.

History
During his visit to the war torn city of Sarajevo in March 1995 and paid a courtesy call to Bosnian President Alija Izetbegović, Indonesian President Suharto contemplating an idea to build a mosque in the city as a gift for the people of Bosnia and Herzegovina. Suharto mobilized his administrations to realize his idea, and appointing Fauzan Noe’man, one of Indonesia's foremost architect to design the mosque and proceed with the project. Noe'man was known for his works in constructing grand mosque of Batam, Baiturrahim mosque in Merdeka Palace complex, and also At-Tin mosque (1999) in East Jakarta near Taman Mini Indonesia Indah. The project is started in 1995, however because the turmoil in Indonesia led to the fall of Suharto in 1998 has stalled the construction process.

The mosque was completed and inaugurated in September 2001 by Indonesian Minister of Religious Affairs Said Agil Al Munawar. A year later  in September 2002 during her stately visit to Sarajevo, President Megawati Soekarnoputri also visited the mosque.

Architecture
The Istiqlal mosque of Sarajevo demonstrate postmodern interpretation of Islamic architecture as viewed from Indonesian perspective. The mosque built with simple geometric elements and patterns on metal-works made from stainless steel or aluminum and glass blocks applied on facade, windows and arches. The exterior were covered with white tiles, while the interior, especially in mihrab, minbar and window frames were adorned with Indonesian wooden carving of floral ornaments.

Built on 2,800 square meters land on Otoka on western side of the city, the mosque is one among the largest mosque in Sarajevo and easily recognizable as the landmark in the neighborhood. The mosque has a single copper-colored dome measured 27 meters tall and 27 meters in diameter. The dome is equipped with three horizontal openings around the dome to allow natural lights to enter the mosque's interior beneath the dome. This type of dome is similar to those of At-Tin mosque in Jakarta, also designed by Fauzan Noe’man. Two twin towers flanking the entrance with reminiscent of Iranian iwan facade style. The tower height is 48 meters. The tip of the dome and twin towers are adorned with three spherical pinnacles with star and crescent on top of it. The twin towers symbolize two nations, as the mosque represents the friendship and solidarity between Indonesia and Bosnia and Herzegovina.

See also
 Bosnia and Herzegovina–Indonesia relations

References

External links
 Pictures of Istiqlal Mosque, Sarajevo

Mosques in Sarajevo
Mosques completed in 2001